Oğuz Çalışkan (born 7 November 1988) is a Turkish footballer who plays as a goalkeeper for Iğdır.

References

External links

1988 births
People from Beypazarı
Living people
Turkish footballers
Association football goalkeepers
MKE Ankaragücü footballers
Hatayspor footballers
Gümüşhanespor footballers
Şanlıurfaspor footballers
Turgutluspor footballers
Sakaryaspor footballers
Ankara Demirspor footballers
TFF First League players
TFF Second League players
TFF Third League players